A pacemaker action potential is the kind of action potential that provides a reference rhythm for the network.  This contrasts with pacemaker potential or current which drives rhythmic modulation of firing rate.

Some pacemaker action generate rhythms for the heart beat (sino-atrial node) or the circadian rhythm in the suprachiasmatic nucleus.

Cardiac electrophysiology
Action potentials